This is a list of awards and nominations received by American composer and screenwriter Justin Hurwitz. He is best known for scoring the 2016 film La La Land. He also scored Damien Chazelle's four other features, Babylon, First Man, Whiplash, and Guy and Madeline on a Park Bench. He's won four Golden Globe Awards, two Academy Awards, and a BAFTA Award for his work on La La Land, First Man, and Babylon.

Major associations

Academy Awards

BAFTA Awards

Golden Globe Awards

Grammy Awards

Primetime Emmy Awards

Other awards and nominations

Atlanta Film Critics Circle

Austin Film Critics Association

Boston Society of Film Critics

Capri Hollywood International Film Festival

Chicago Film Critics Association

Columbus Film Critics Association

Critics' Choice Movie Awards

Dallas–Fort Worth Film Critics Association

Denver Film Critics Society

Florida Film Critics Circle

Georgia Film Critics Association

Hawaii Film Critics Society

Hollywood Film Awards

Houston Film Critics Society

Las Vegas Film Critics Society

Los Angeles Film Critics Association

Los Angeles Online Film Critics Society

New Mexico Film Critics

New York Film Critics Online

North Carolina Film Critics Association

Online Film Critics Society

Phoenix Critics Circle

Phoenix Film Critics Society

Producers Guild of America Awards

San Francisco Film Critics Circle

Satellite Awards

Seattle Film Critics Society

St. Louis Gateway Film Critics Association

Washington D.C. Area Film Critics Association

Writers Guild of America Awards

References

External links

Hurwitz, Justin